Raymond "Rags" Matthews (August 17, 1905 – January 2, 1999) was an American football player at Texas Christian University (TCU) in the 1920s. A Fort Worth, Texas native, Matthews attended Polytechnic High School before TCU. He lettered three times under coach Matty Bell, during which the TCU Horned Frogs posted a cumulative record of 17–5–5. He was named the team's Most Valuable Player after the 1926 and 1927 seasons, and was selected to play in the Shrine East-West All-Star Game as a senior in 1927, the first year players from the Southwest Conference were included.

Matthews was named to the All-Time All-SWC Team in 1969, and was elected to the College Football Hall of Fame in 1971. He died in his hometown at the age of 93 in 1999.

References

External links
 

1905 births
1999 deaths
American football ends
TCU Horned Frogs football players
All-Southern college football players
College Football Hall of Fame inductees
People from Fort Worth, Texas
Players of American football from Texas